Sergio Choque is a politician from Bolivia who served as President of the Chamber of Deputies of Bolivia.

Personal life 
He was born in September 28, 1968 in El Alto. In 2004, he was incarcerated for six years for making false stamped paper.

References 

1968 births
Living people
People from El Alto
Presidents of the Chamber of Deputies (Bolivia)